Season of the Sparks is the fifth studio album released by Irish singer-songwriter Adrian Crowley. On March 3, 2010, it was announced as the winner of the Choice Music Prize for Irish Album of the Year 2009 at Vicar Street, Dublin.

It was released on April 24, 2009.

Reception
Hot Press gave Season of the Sparks five stars, calling it a "batch of beautiful Al Stewart/Leonard Cohenesque pastoral reflections". RTÉ reviewer Harry Guerin gave the record four out of five stars and called it "an album for all seasons". Lauren Murphy, who reviewed the album for The Irish Times, also gave it four out of five stars, stating that this is Crowley's "most consistently beautiful album yet" and that the artist "utilises his lyrical talent to conjure up the most gorgeous imagery this side of the Shannon". The Sunday Times reviewer Dan Cairns also gave it four out of five stars, calling it "a great album" and saying it was " like a Paula Rego painting set to music". State called it "that rare and precious thing, a perfect expression of joy", noting that the first track "Summer Haze Parade" was "Crowley's most overtly uplifting moment to date". Clash praised Crowley's "ability to craft a beautiful lullaby to the simplicity of the countryside".

Season of the Sparks was the last album to be reviewed by Les Inrockuptibles journalist Richard Robert before he retired after 35 years of work. Robert sent a letter to Crowley in Dublin expressing his joy about the album.

Track listing
Season of the Sparks features ten tracks, including the title track "Season of the Sparks".

Awards
Season of the Sparks won the Choice Music Prize for Irish Album of the Year 2009 at Vicar Street on March 3, 2010. It was chosen by a panel of twelve people from the Irish music industry as most deserving winner from a shortlist of ten albums. Crowley received a prize of €10,000 cheque. He described himself as "totally flabbergasted", adding "I didn't really think it was the sort of record that was going to win awards". Crowley promised to use the money to fund his music. He was one of eight nominees who performed at the awards ceremony, including the Academy Award-winning, Grammy Award-nominated The Swell Season and Crowley's close friend Valerie Francis.

|-
| 2010 || Season of the Sparks || Choice Music Prize - Irish Album of the Year 2009 || 
|-

References

2009 albums
Adrian Crowley albums
Choice Music Prize-winning albums